Fidelia is a feminine given name. 

Notable people with the name include:

Fidelia Bridges (1834–1923), American artist
Fidelia Jewett (1851–1933), American educator
Fidelia Njeze (born 1964), Nigerian diplomat

See also
Fidelia (pseudonym), a popular pseudonym of 18th-century English writers